"Keep It Comin' Love" is a song by KC and the Sunshine Band, released as a single in 1977. It appeared on their 1976 album, Part 3. The song, like its predecessor "That's the Way (I Like It)", became widely successful due to its sexual double entendres.

Chart performance
"Keep It Comin' Love" peaked at No. 2 on the Billboard Hot 100, kept out of the No.1 spot by both "Star Wars Theme/Cantina Band" by Meco and "You Light Up My Life" by Debby Boone. The song made it to number one on the Hot Soul Singles chart. It was also a minor crossover to the Adult Contemporary chart, peaking at No. 36. The song was also an international chart hit, reaching No. 1 in Canada and charting in Australia (No. 28), Belgium (No. 5), the Netherlands (No. 8), New Zealand (No. 19) and the United Kingdom (No. 31).

Weekly charts

Year-end charts

See also
List of number-one singles of 1977 (Canada)
List of number-one R&B singles of 1977 (U.S.)

References

External links

1977 singles
1977 songs
KC and the Sunshine Band songs
RPM Top Singles number-one singles
Songs written by Harry Wayne Casey
Songs written by Richard Finch (musician)
TK Records singles